is one of the eight wards of Niigata City, Niigata Prefecture, in the Hokuriku region of  Japan. , the ward had an estimated population of 74,559 in households  and a population density of 690 persons per km².

Geography

Surrounding municipalities
Niigata Prefecture
 Higashi-ku, Niigata
Kōnan-ku, Niigata
 Shibata
 Agano
 Seiro

History
The area of present-day Kita-ku was part of ancient Echigo Province. The village of Kuzudzuka was established on April 1, 1889 within Kitakanbara District, Niigata with the establishment of the modern municipalities system, and was raised to town status on November 1, 1901. It was renamed Toyosaka on March 31, 1955 and was elevated to city status on November 1, 1970.  The city of Niigata annexed Toyosaka on March 21, 2005. Niigata became a government-designated city on April 1, 2007 and was divided into wards, with former Toyosaka becoming part of the new Kita Ward along with a coastal section of the former Niigata city.

Education

University
 Niigata University of Health and Welfare

Primary and secondary education
Kita-ku has 13 public elementary schools and eight public middle schools operated by the Niigata city government. The ward has one public high school operated by the Niigata Prefectural Board of Education and one private high school.

Transportation

Railway
 JR East -  Hakushin Line
  -  -  -

Transit bus
 Transit bus operated by Niigata Kotsu
 E2 / E4
 Toyosaka Sta. - JRA Racecourse
 Toyosaka Sta. - Tsukioka Onsen

Highways

Points of interest

Places

 Fukushimagata Lagoon Water Park
 Niigata Racecourse, one of the racecourses of JRA
 Niigata Senbei Okoku

References

External links

 Niigata City official website 
 Niigata Kita-ku website 
 Niigata City Official Tourist Information (multilingual)
 Niigata Pref. Official Travel Guide (multilingual)

Wards of Niigata (city)